The sixth season of Offspring, an Australian drama television series, premiered on Network TEN on 29 June 2016.

Production

On 3 October 2014, John Edwards confirmed that Offspring would not return for a sixth series in 2015, due to Ten's cost-cutting measures in its production division.
On 30 August 2015, the Herald Sun reported that a sixth season of Offspring would be made - returning after a two-year hiatus.

On 20 September 2015, Ten confirmed that Offspring would return for a sixth season in 2016. Production for the series began on 25 April 2016 and ran through to June 2016. Series 6 premiered on 29 June 2016.

With the return of the series, creator Deb Oswald and long-term writer Michael Lucas announced that they weren't returning to the series for the sixth season. Jonathon Gavin, another long-term writer, has stepped into the place of head writer, citing that he always thought there was more to the Proudmans' story. Gavin stated, about the return of the series, "Deb [Oswald] said that she conceived Offspring as the opposite of those shows where there's a dead prostitute lying in a dumpster in the beginning of the episode. This is a show that's affirming of all the things that make life great: food, sex, love, family, babies, dogs. The things that make life meaningful are our relationships to other people, those tiny moments when you have a connection with another human being. Offspring is a celebration of that."

The show's return after almost two years fast-forwards 18 months past where season five ended. Nina has been in a relationship with Leo. Billie has been managing husband Mick's tour in the UK and youngest sibling Jimmy runs his busy Mexican taqueria while his wife Zara studies for a medical degree.

Of the new season, Kat Stewart stated, "There's a life-changing event that shifts the ground for everybody and it provides us with an opportunity to mine a bit deeper with the characters, in a way that you can't do with a movie, or a play, or a short-run series. We've got all this history, so we don't run out of material, we just mine deeper."

Cast

Main
Asher Keddie as Nina Proudman
Kat Stewart as Billie Proudman
Richard Davies as Jimmy Proudman
Deborah Mailman as Cherie Butterfield
Jane Harber as Zara Perkich Proudman
Linda Cropper as Geraldine Proudman

Recurring
Alicia Gardiner as Kim Akerholt
Eddie Perfect as Mick Holland
Lachy Hulme as Martin Clegg
Lawrence Leung as Elvis Kwan
Patrick Brammall as Leo Taylor
Dan Wyllie as Angus Freeman
T.J. Power as Will Bowen
Sarah Peirse as Marjorie Van Dyke
 Shannon Berry as Brody Jordan
 Alexander England as Harry Crewe

Guest 
Matthew Le Nevez as Dr Patrick Reid
Ido Drent as Dr Lawrence Pethbridge

Episodes

Viewership

References

2016 Australian television seasons